Kalamazoo is a Canadian fantasy drama film, directed by André Forcier and released in 1988. The film stars Rémy Girard as Félix Cotnoir, a retired botanist who meets painter Pasquale Globensky (Tony Nardi) after crashing his car into a telephone booth; introduced by Globensky to the novel Kalamazoo by writer Hélène Montana (Marie Tifo), he soon falls in love with a mermaid who is Hélène's double in appearance.

The film won the Prix L.-E.-Ouimet-Molson from the Association québécoise des critiques de cinéma in 1989.

References

External links
 

1988 films
1988 drama films
Canadian drama films
Films directed by André Forcier
French-language Canadian films
1980s Canadian films
1980s French-language films